Club Deportivo Unión Sur Yaiza is a Spanish football team based in Yaiza, in the autonomous community of Canary Islands. Founded on 13 June 1983, it plays in Tercera División RFEF – Group 12, holding home matches at Estadio Municipal de Yaiza, with a capacity of 2,000 people.

Season to season

7 seasons in Tercera División
1 season in Tercera División RFEF

References

External links
Soccerway team profile

Football clubs in the Canary Islands
Sport in Lanzarote
Association football clubs established in 1983
1983 establishments in Spain